Slippery When Wet is the third studio album by American rock band Bon Jovi. It was released on August 18, 1986, by Mercury Records in North America and Vertigo Records internationally. It was produced by Bruce Fairbairn, with recording sessions between January and July 1986 at Little Mountain Sound Studios in Vancouver. The album features many of Bon Jovi's best-known songs, including "You Give Love a Bad Name", "Livin' on a Prayer", and "Wanted Dead or Alive".

The album has been called the album that "[turned] heavy metal into a radio-friendly pop format", and is also commonly seen as "a breakthrough for hair metal".

Slippery When Wet was an instant commercial success, spending eight weeks at No. 1 on the U.S. Billboard 200 chart and was named by Billboard as the top-selling album of 1987. Slippery When Wet is Bon Jovi's best-selling album to date, with an RIAA certification of 12× Platinum, making it one of the top 100 best-selling albums in the United States.

Background
Upon its 1985 release, 7800° Fahrenheit achieved moderate success, but Bon Jovi had not yet become superstars. The band changed its approach for the next album, with a more mainstream sound than the heavier first two albums. Hiring Desmond Child as a collaborator, the band wrote 30 songs and auditioned them for local New Jersey (including recording artist and Phantom's Opera vocalist Colie Brice) and New York teenagers, basing the album's running order on their opinions. Bruce Fairbairn was chosen as the producer for the album, with Bob Rock as the mixer. The 1985 album Without Love which Fairbairn produced for the heavy metal band Black 'n Blue, attracted Jon Bon Jovi with its sound quality, and he immediately sought out the producer.

Writing and composition
Much of the album was written by Jon Bon Jovi and Richie Sambora, whereas "You Give Love a Bad Name", "Livin' on a Prayer", "Without Love", and "I'd Die For You" were co-written with Desmond Child, and "Wild in the Streets" was by Bon Jovi alone. This was the first time Child worked with Jon and Richie. He came to New Jersey, where they worked on the four songs in Sambora's mother's basement.

Jon Bon Jovi explained, "I liked what Bryan Adams had done with Tina Turner so I suggested we do something similar: I write a song for someone like her, and then we do the song together. But that got changed, and our A&R guy came up with Desmond's name ... He hasn't tried to change what we are, but to refine it slightly; to suggest extra ways that we could wring a bit more out of what we had."

Bon Jovi was initially reluctant to include "Livin' on a Prayer", believing it was not good enough. Sambora convinced him it was a hit in the making, and so the band rerecorded it, releasing the second version on the album. It is Bon Jovi's signature song.

One of the songs written during the making of the album, "Edge of a Broken Heart", is not on the final release. Bon Jovi has since said it should have been included: "It was absolutely appropriate for the Slippery record—coulda, shoulda, woulda been on Slippery had cooler minds prevailed. Here's my formal apology." Featured on the soundtrack to the 1987 movie Disorderlies, it has since been released on the 2-CD edition of Cross Road, the box set 100,000,000 Bon Jovi Fans Can't Be Wrong and the B-side for the Livin' on a Prayer single album. The song has never been performed live by the band, though a fan favorite.

In 1986, Bon Jovi said "There's a song called 'Love Is A Social Disease' that Aerosmith were keen to get hold of. It would be ideal for them, but they're not having it, because it's even better for us."

Title and artwork
The album's name was changed during its inception, including Wanted Dead or Alive. A proposed cover with the band dressed as cowboys was later used for the single release of the track of the same name.

According to Bon Jovi, the band named the album Slippery When Wet after visiting The No.5 Orange strip club in Vancouver, British Columbia. According to Sambora, "This woman descended from the ceiling on a pole and proceeded to take all her clothes off. When she got in a shower and soaped herself up, we just about lost our tongues. We just sat there and said, 'We will be here every day.' That energized us through the whole project. Our testosterone was at a very high level back then."

The cover consists of a wet black garbage bag with the words "Slippery When Wet" traced in the water. "So simple, and not very impressive", said Sambora. The album originally was to feature a busty woman in a wet yellow T-shirt with the album name on the front of the shirt. This was swapped for the plastic bag cover just prior to release. The reasons given for the switch were record executives' fears that dominant record store chains at the time would have refused to carry the album with a sexist cover, and Jon Bon Jovi's dislike of the bright pink border around the photograph the band submitted. Sambora said, "Our label freaked out a bit when they saw what we'd done. They thought it would be banned by American stores, so we had to come up with something else – fast."

In Japan, most releases of the album included the original cover art.

Release
In 2005, Slippery When Wet was re-issued as a DualDisc. The CD side contains a newly remastered version. The DVD side contains the same album in its original stereo mix, a slightly expanded 5.1 surround sound version, and all 5 music videos. The expanded album includes additional elements within many of the songs, in some cases increasing their runtime. The DualDisc was released on September 20, 2005, the same release date as Have a Nice Day.

Reception

The album was a massive commercial success. Between 1986 and 1987, Slippery When Wet produced a string of hit songs, including three Top 10 Billboard Hot 100 hits, two of which ("You Give Love a Bad Name" and "Livin' on a Prayer") reached No. 1, making Bon Jovi the first glam metal band to have ever had two consecutive No. 1 Billboard Hot 100 chart hits. The third single "Wanted Dead or Alive" peaked at No. 7, making Slippery When Wet the first metal album to have had three Billboard Hot 100 Top 10 hits.

The album peaked at No. 1 on the Billboard 200, making it Bon Jovi's first number-one album in the United States. The album spent 38 weeks inside the Top 5 of Billboard 200, including 8 weeks at No. 1. It is the best-selling album of 1987 in the United States, and eventually reached Diamond certification by the RIAA and current sales stand at 12 million copies, making it the 48th best-selling album in the United States.

In the UK, Slippery When Wet received a 3× Platinum certification by the BPI. The album also achieved Diamond status in Canada, and 6× Platinum status in Australia.

The album is ranked 44th in the Rock and Roll Hall of Fame's list of the Definitive 200 albums of all time.

Slippery When Wet was met with generally positive reviews. Writing in The Village Voice in September 1987, Robert Christgau said, "Sure seven million teenagers can be wrong, but their assent is not without a certain documentary satisfaction. Yes, it proves that youth rebellion is toothless enough to simulate and market. But who the hell thought youth was dangerous in the current vacuum? Would you have preferred the band market patriotism? And are you really immune to 'Livin' on a Prayer'?" In 1990 in Rolling Stone, Jimmy Guterman thoroughly berated the band and the album. "Jon Bon Jovi and his band serve up condescending sentiment, reducing every emotional statement to a barefaced cliché – either because they think that's all their audience can comprehend or because that's all they can comprehend. On Slippery When Wet, Bon Jovi sounds like bad fourth-generation metal, a smudgy Xerox of Quiet Riot."

Track listing

Personnel
Credits partly sourced from AllMusic.

Bon Jovi
Jon Bon Jovi – lead & backing vocals, rhythm guitar, acoustic guitar on "Wanted Dead or Alive"
Richie Sambora – acoustic & electric guitars, guitar synths, talk box on "Livin' on a Prayer", backing vocals
Alec John Such – bass, backing vocals
Tico Torres – drums, percussion, finger cymbals on "Livin' on a Prayer"
David Bryan – keyboards, "noise", backing vocals

Studio musicians
Tom Keenlyside – saxophone
Mike Reno – possible backing vocals on "Livin' on a Prayer" (uncredited)

Production
Bruce Fairbairn – producer, horns, percussion
Bob Rock – engineering, mixing
Tim Crich – assistant engineering
George Marino – digital remastering
Bill Levy – artwork, art direction
Mark Weiss – photography
George Corsillo – design

Charts

Weekly charts

Year-end charts

Decade-end charts

Certifications and sales

Accolades

See also
List of best-selling albums
List of best-selling albums in the United States
List of glam metal albums and songs

References

External links
 

1986 albums
Bon Jovi albums
Mercury Records albums
Vertigo Records albums
Albums produced by Bruce Fairbairn
Albums recorded at Little Mountain Sound Studios